KAlarm is a personal alarm message, command and email scheduler application integrated with the KDE desktop environment. When a scheduled alarm goes off, KAlarm can display a text message or image file, run a command, send an email or play a sound file, acting like an alarm clock. KAlarm supports the scheduling of multiple alarm times and alarm dates. Aside from control through the graphical interface KAlarm can also be operated using the command line.

References

External links

 KAlarm in kde.org
 The KAlarm Handbook
 KAlarm in userbase.kde.org
 KDE PIM Project Homepage

KDE Applications
Kdepim